Nicholas John Young (born 11 June 1949) is a British actor.

Young portrayed John in the 1970s British TV series The Tomorrow People. He played a different role, Prof, Aldus Crick, in the show's 2013 revival.

He appeared as Franz Hoss in Kessler (1981).

References

External links
 

1949 births
English male television actors
Living people